The Archdiocese of Brasília is ecclesiastical territory or archdiocese of the Latin Church of the Catholic Church located in the city of Brasília in Brazil. The archdiocese is a metropolitan see.

History
 January 16, 1960: Established as Diocese of Brasília from the Metropolitan Archdiocese of Goiânia
 October 11, 1966: Promoted to Metropolitan Archdiocese of Brasília

Bishops

Archbishops of Brasília
 Jose Newton de Almeida Baptista (1960–1984), was Archbishop (personal title) until the see was raised to archdiocese in 1966
 José Freire Falcão (1984–2004) (Cardinal in 1988)
 João Braz de Aviz (2004–2011), appointed Prefect of the Congregation for Institutes of Consecrated Life and Societies of Apostolic Life (Cardinal in 2012)
 Sérgio da Rocha (2011–2020) (Cardinal in 2016), appointed Archbishop of São Salvador da Bahia
 Paulo Cezar Costa (2020–present) (Cardinal in 2022)

Auxiliary bishops
Aloísio Sinésio Bohn (1977-1980), appointed Bishop of Novo Hamburgo, Río Grande do Sul
Geraldo do Espírito Santo Ávila (1977-1990), appointed Archbishop of Brazil, Military
Raymundo Damasceno Assis (1986-2004), appointed Archbishop of Aparecida, São Paulo (Cardinal in 2010)
Alberto Taveira Corrêa (1991-1996), appointed Archbishop of Palmas, Tocantins
Jésus Rocha (1993-2004), appointed Bishop of Oliveira, Minas Gerais
João Evangelista Martins Terra, S.J. (1994-2004)
Francisco de Paula Victor (1996-2011)
Leonardo Ulrich Steiner, O.F.M. (2011-2019), appointed Archbishop of Manaus, Amazonas
Valdir Mamede (2013-2019), appointed Bishop of Catanduva, São Paulo
José Aparecido Gonçalves de Almeida (2013-
Marcony Vinícius Ferreira (2014-

Other priests of this diocese who became bishops
José Ronaldo Ribeiro, appointed Bishop of Janaúba, Minas Gerais in 2007
Waldemar Passini Dalbello, appointed Auxiliary Bishop of Goiânia, Goias in 2009; Apostolic Administrator here in 2011
Marcos Antônio Tavoni, appointed Bishop of Bom Jesus do Gurguéia, Piaui in 2014
Jeová Elias Ferreira, appointed Bishop of Goias in 2020
Giovanni Carlos Caldas Barroca, appointed Bishop of Uruaçu (Uruassu), Goias in 2020

Suffragan dioceses
 Diocese of Formosa 
 Diocese of Luziânia
 Diocese of Uruaçu

Sources
 GCatholic.org
 Catholic Hierarchy

Roman Catholic dioceses in Brazil
Brasilia
 
Christian organizations established in 1960
Roman Catholic dioceses and prelatures established in the 20th century
1960 establishments in Brazil